The Greek Basketball Super Cup or Hellenic Basketball Super Cup (also stylized as Basket Super Cup), is the top-tier level professional basketball national super cup competition in Greece. The first edition of the tournament, was organized by the Hellenic Basketball Federation (E.O.K.), in 1986. It was contested by the Greek Basket League champions and the Greek Basketball Cup winners. However, the Greek Basketball Super Cup was revived in 2020, by the Hellenic Basketball Association (HEBA), under a final four tournament format.

History and competition format
The Greek Basketball Super Cup was first held in 1986. It featured Aris, the champions of the Greek Basket League's 1985–86 season, and Panathinaikos, the winners of the 1985–86 Greek Basketball Cup. It was contested under a two-legged format, and the winner was decided by aggregate score. Aris won the first game at home, by a score of 117–85, and they also won the second game on the road, by a score of 104–88, and thus won the first Greek Super Cup, by an aggregate score of 221–173. Aris then went on to win both the Greek Basket League championship and the Greek Basketball Cup title, or the Greek domestic double, for the next four consecutive seasons (1986–87, 1987–88, 1988–89, 1989–90). As a result, the tournament was not held again during that time, since its format didn't allow it to be held after the same team won both titles in the same season. Eventually, the original organizers of the competition, the Hellenic Basketball Federation (E.O.K.), decided that the Greek Super Cup was no longer needed, and they cancelled it.

In September 2020, the Hellenic Basketball Association (HEBA), decided to hold its own new version of the Greek Basketball Super Cup competition. Under the current competition format, the top two ranked teams from the previous Greek Basket League season, along with the two finalists of the previous Greek Cup tournament, compete against each other, in a final four, with single elimination games. If the same team or teams, finished in both the top two places of the previous season's Greek League and Greek Cup competitions, then the next highest-placed team or teams from the previous season's Greek League competition will take part in the Greek Super Cup.

Promitheas Patras won the 2020 Greek Super Cup, on September 24, 2020 in the Athens final four. Panathinaikos OPAP won the 2021 Greek Super Cup, on September 26, 2021 in the Patras final four. Olympiacos won the 2022 Greek Super Cup, on October 2, 2022 in the Rhodes final four.

Greek Super Cup winners
 
 1986:  Aris
 2020:  Promitheas Patras 
 2021:  Panathinaikos OPAP
 2022:  Olympiacos

Finals

Titles by club

Titles by city
Three clubs have won the Greek Basketball Super Cup.

Final Fours
The 2020 Greek Super Cup competition introduced the Final Four system.

Final 4 performance by club

Greek Super Cup records
Source: ESAKE

Individual

Single game
 Most points scored
 44 by  Nikos Galis ( Aris), against Panathinaikos OPAP on August 27, 1986

 Most rebounds
 13 by  Yanick Moreira ( AEK Athens), against Panathinaikos OPAP on September 24, 2020

 Most assists
 10 by  Abdul Gaddy ( Peristeri), against Panathinaikos OPAP on September 23, 2020

Overall
 Most points scored
 85 by  Nikos Galis ( Aris), against Panathinaikos OPAP in 1986

 Most rebounds
 36 by  Georgios Papagiannis ( Panathinaikos OPAP), in 2020, 2021, and 2022

Team

Single game
 Most points scored
 117 by  Aris, against Panathinaikos OPAP on August 27, 1986

 Fewest points scored
 52 by  Panathinaikos OPAP, against Olympiacos on October 2, 2022

Overall
 Most points scored
 624 by  Panathinaikos OPAP, in 1986, 2020, 2021, and 2022

 Fewest points scored
 128 by  Lavrio, in 2021

See also
Greek Basket League
Greek Basketball Cup
HEBA Greek All-Star Game
Hellenic Basketball Federation (E.O.K.)
Hellenic Basketball Association (HEBA)

References

External links 
  
 Official Hellenic Basketball Federation Site 

Greek Basketball Super Cup
1986 establishments in Greece
Basketball cup competitions in Greece
Greece